"Ultimatum" is the thirteenth episode of the seventh season of the American comedy television series The Office, and the show's 139th episode overall. Written by Carrie Kemper, and directed by David Rogers, the episode first aired in the United States on January 20, 2011 on NBC.

The series depicts the everyday lives of office employees at the Scranton, Pennsylvania branch of the fictitious Dunder Mufflin Paper Company. In the episode, Michael Scott (Steve Carell) attempts to court Holly Flax (Amy Ryan) after her relationship with A.J. (Rob Huebel) seemingly ends as a result of an ultimatum that he propose to her by the end of the year. Meanwhile, Pam Halpert (Jenna Fischer) starts a New Year's resolution initiative at the office, but her coworkers struggle to keep their resolutions or find motivation to do so.

The episode achieved a viewership of 8.29 million during its initial airing in the United States, according to Nielsen Media Research. John Krasinki's Jim Halpert was only seen in the episode's cold open, and does not appear in the rest of the episode.

Synopsis
Michael Scott (Steve Carell) anticipates news regarding the status of Holly Flax (Amy Ryan) and A.J.'s (Rob Huebel) relationship, after Holly's ultimatum that A.J. propose to her by the end of the year. To prepare for either outcome, Michael fills a "happy box" with celebration treats and a "sad box" with consolation items, as well as two videos of himself to be used to calm himself down should he get too excited or too depressed. When Michael sees no ring on Holly's finger, he is at first ecstatic, and launches into celebration in his office. When he approaches Holly to talk, however, Holly receives a phone call from A.J., during which she tells him she loves him. Michael finds out later, through Phyllis Vance (Phyllis Smith) and Erin Hannon (Ellie Kemper), that Holly caved on the ultimatum and that she and A.J. are still together.

Pam Halpert (Jenna Fischer), inspired by the cheerful office administrator from Vance Refrigeration, puts up a New Year's Resolution board in the office so everyone can post their resolutions. These include Michael resolving to floss, Kevin Malone (Brian Baumgartner) resolving to eat more vegetables, Ryan Howard (B. J. Novak) resolving to "live life like it's an art project," and Creed Bratton (Creed Bratton) resolving to do a cartwheel. When Dwight Schrute (Rainn Wilson) reveals his resolution is to "meet a loose woman", he goes out on the town along with fellow single men Darryl Philbin (Craig Robinson) and Andy Bernard (Ed Helms), in the hopes of meeting some women. Darryl suggests they try a bookstore, actually wanting to fulfill his own resolution to "read more" by purchasing an e-book reader.

Still upset about Holly, Michael interrupts Pam's resolution-board meeting to chastise his employees for giving up on their resolutions, taking out his frustration on Kevin by force-feeding him broccoli as well as berating Creed for not attempting a cartwheel. Holly sees the parallel Michael is making between these abandoned resolutions and her own abandoned ultimatum, and abruptly leaves the room, visibly upset. Michael attempts to apologize to Holly, but she declines to talk. Michael has her join Kevin and Creed in his office so he can apologize to the two of them, simultaneously apologizing to Holly indirectly. Holly is later caught by the cameras telling A.J. that she wants to take a break from their relationship at least until she returns to Nashua.

As the new year's resolutions get out of hand, Pam tosses the resolution board into a dumpster, saying she has learned her lesson.

Production
The episode was written by Carrie Kemper, the sister of cast member Ellie Kemper, her first writing credit on the series. It was directed by David Rogers, his third directing credit; Rogers also serves as an editor for the series.
Jim is only present during the cold open. He is then absent without explanation for the rest of the episode. In a deleted scene, his voice is heard when he talks to Pam on the phone as he is driving to make a sale. In real life, John Krasinski was filming Big Miracle in Alaska during filming of the episode.

Reception
In its original American broadcast on January 20, 2011, "Ultimatum" was viewed by an estimated 8.29 million viewers and received a 4.5 rating/12% share among adults between the ages of 18 and 49, reaching a season-high for the demo and increasing in more than a million viewers from the previous episode. In Canada, the episode was watched by 212,000 viewers, the lowest watched program of the night.

References

External links
 "Ultimatum" at NBC.com
 

The Office (American season 7) episodes
2011 American television episodes
New Year television episodes